West Pittsburg is an unincorporated community and census-designated place (CDP) in southern Taylor Township, Lawrence County, Pennsylvania, United States. As of the 2010 census it had a population of 808.

Its main street is the north-south Pennsylvania Route 168, which crosses the river at the southern end of the community.

West Pittsburg P&LE Station

For a small community, West Pittsburg had one of the largest railroad stations built in the north Pittsburgh area. At one time, the Pittsburgh and Lake Erie Railroad thought that the community would become a major railroad hub and constructed a large railroad station that would serve passengers on "The Little Giant". Other railroads that would have benefited were the Baltimore and Ohio Railroad and the Western Allegheny Railroad. However, the hub never materialized. Over time, the three railroads went out of business, but CSX Transportation and the Buffalo and Pittsburgh Railroad continue to use the yard near the West Pittsburg Station to transport freight to cities like Pittsburgh, Butler, Cleveland, New Castle, and Youngstown. The station is currently undergoing a major renovation that will turn it into a museum.

References

External links
Beaver-Lawrence Railway Historical Society
Map

Census-designated places in Lawrence County, Pennsylvania
Census-designated places in Pennsylvania